Sasural Simar Ka is an Indian Hindi-language television soap opera produced by Rashmi Sharma Telefilms, that aired from 25 April 2011 to 2 March 2018 on Colors TV. It starred Dipika Kakar, Keerti Gaekwad Kelkar, Avika Gor, Dheeraj Dhoopar, Shoaib Ibrahim and Mazher Sayed. It is the second longest-running Indian television series on Colors TV after Balika Vadhu, which also featured Avika Gor.

Plot 
The story revolves around the lives of two sisters from Vrindavan, Simar and Roli. Simar dreams of becoming a dancer but her parents are against her dream. Her marriage is fixed with a wealthy businessman, Prem Bharadwaj. On wedding day, Simar has to participate in a dancing contest and Roli takes her place until her return. As Simar is late, Roli is forced to marry Prem. This creates problems as Simar and Prem start loving each other. Prem's brother Siddhant enters, who was expelled from the house. After some twists and turns, Simar-Prem and Roli-Siddhant get married. Eventually, both Simar and Roli are accepted to Bharadwaj house.

Soon, Khushi enters to take revenge for her sister Anisha's death and tries to kill Simar. She tricks the Bhardwaj family and marries their son, Sankalp. Simar is pregnant but miscarries, which makes her to never conceive and become a mother. Khushi becomes surrogate mother of Prem and Simar's child. She blackmails Simar to sign the property papers. Later, Khushi is exposed and gives birth to Prem and Simar's daughter Anjali.Khushi and her boyfriend veeru grabs the property and the whole family lives as servants.Roli initiates a plan to make veeru fall in love with her and manages to get back the property papers and saves the family.

Simar and Roli find their long-lost sister-in-law, Jhanvi. Soon, Shaurya enters Jhanvi's life and marries her. He creates trouble but Jhanvi shoots him to death. Then, she marries Dr. Anurag. Simar and Roli save the family from Shobha, Shakti, Meghna Singhania, Bhakti and politician Jwala Devi. Jwala kidnaps Roli and while escaping, Roli unintentionally hits a car, thus leading a woman named Sunaina to die. To save Roli, Simar goes to Sunaina's family, faking her death, and lives as Sunaina as per Sunaina's husband Vikrant Mehta's instructions.

2 years later

Simar lives as Sunaina and raises the Mehta's daughter, Sanjana while Roli takes care of Anjali. Prem has married his sister-in-law Pari's sister, Surbhi. Simar returns and has to cope up with Sunaina's spirit who has returned for revenge from Vikrant's family who were the people behind her death. Prem, Roli and Siddhant also join with Simar. Eventually, Sunaina and Surabhi are banished. Vikrant falls in love with Simar and tries to murder Prem; thus, is sent to jail. Sanjana gets adopted by Simar and Prem.

Later, the story revolves around Simar, Roli, Prem and Siddhant and how they protect Bharadwaj house from some supernatural creatures who want to destroy them. These supernatural creatures include shapeshifting female serpent Maya, Dayans Mohini and Indravati, Patali Devi-Gayatri, ghosts Maalti, Madhavi and Chhoti Dulhan, Shaitan (Kaal), Moon Jewel Princess Chandramani and another two Dayans Mahamaya and Kamya. While defeating Patali Devi-Gayatri and Kaal, Simar's life falls in danger. To protect her elder sister, Roli sacrifices her life. After Roli's sad demise, a depressed Siddhant is remarried to her childhood friend Prerna and moves abroad with her. To gain his powers back and return to the world, Kaal with the help of Mahamaya and Kamya casts a spell on Simar and impregnates her with a child possessing evil powers. Simar becomes aware of this mysterious plan and soon witnesses Kamya's real vintage. The family learns of this, too. Simar and Prem have a son, Piyush. Being in doubt of the baby's spookiness, the family asks Simar to donate away the child. Simar refuses and leaves her in-laws with Piyush.

21 years later

Simar and Piyush return to Bharadwaj house and reunite with their family. Now Anjali, brought up by Khushi, has grown up to be a spoilt fashionista and blames Simar for abandoning her. Simar and Prem together help their children in their lives. Anjali marries Vikram Agarwal and Piyush marries his best friend, Roshni Kapoor. As Simar helps Anjali to manage her marriage, she accepts her mother.

Kaal awakens on Piyush's birthday, possessing him and killing Roshni's father Sumit Kapoor, but is finally defeated by sorceress Ridhima. Later, Vikram divorces Anjali due to her misbehaviours and marries Tanvi. Sanjana returns to Bharadwaj house from London. The family fixes her marriage with her college friend, Sameer Kapoor. However, Anjali discovers that Sameer is a fraud who is conspiring against the Bharadwajs' and to spare herself from the same fate, she marries Sameer. She humiliates her family members and ill-treats them. Piyush plots a plan to get the Bharadwaj property back from Anjali. Anjali threatens to kill Simar, who shoots her, and Anjali falls into a coma.

Sameer's mother Bhairavi is revealed to have shot Anjali. She enters the Bharadwajs' lives to avenge Prem for killing her husband. It is subsequently revealed that Bhairavi murdered him herself and is using the Bharadwajs as a cover-up. After absorbing supernatural powers, she turns into a daayan and kills Simar. However, the Mother Goddess Durga, deeply worshipped by the Bharadwaj family, enters their household in the form of Simar, to destroy Bhairavi and bring Simar back to life. Sameer repents for his mistakes and the Bharadwajs forgive and accept him. 

Anjali wakes up from coma and asks forgiveness from the family. Her intentions are revealed when she tries to kill her fiancé, Sahil and sets Bharadwaj Mansion on fire, and she is arrested. Simar and others disown her. The Saga of the Mystery Box begins, leading to Aliya, who shoots Roshni with a gun to avenge her father's death due to Piyush's mistake. Roshni dies, leaving the family in sadness and making Piyush mad.

6 months later
Simar and Prem are in search for Piyush, who got lost after Roshni's death. Piyush has lost his memory and is being looked after by Avni. Simar takes him back to Bharadwaj house together with Avni and her mother Hema. Bhairavi has returned from jail and is living with Sameer and Sanjana, but is actually plotting revenge, having paid Avni and Hema to destroy the Bharadwaj family. Sanjana miscarries. When Avni tries to expose Bhairavi, the latter attempts to kill her but instead murders Hema. Bhairavi shooting a gun leads to Piyush regaining his memory.

In the end, Simar kills Bhairavi and Piyush marries Avni, promising her that he would always be by her side. The Bharadwajs worship the Mother Goddess and celebrate togetherness. Pari apologises to Simar for her past mistakes. Simar misses Roli and Nirmala says that the Bharadwaj family is not only a family but a thought. With this, Simar goes to hell a new fight begins.

Cast

Main
Dipika Kakar as 
 Simar Dwivedi Bharadwaj: Meena and Jamnalal's elder daughter; Roli and Gautam's sister; Prem's wife; Anjali and Piyush's mother; Sanjana's adoptive mother (2011–2017) 
 Padmavati Singh: Simar's previous birth; Indravati's sister; Gajendra's wife (2015)
 Keerti Gaekwad Kelkar replaced Kakar as Simar (2017–2018)
Shoaib Ibrahim as Prem Bharadwaj: Sujata and Rajendra's adoptive youngest son; Satyendra, Shailendra, Siddhant and Jhanvi's adoptive brother; Simar's husband; Anjali and Piyush's father; Sanjana's adoptive father. (2011–2013) 
 Dheeraj Dhoopar replaced Ibrahim as Prem (2013–2017)
 Gajendra Singh: Prem's previous birth; Indravati's love interest; Padmavati's husband (2015)
 Mazher Sayed replaced Dhoopar as Prem (2017–2018)
Avika Gor as 
 Roli Dwivedi Bharadwaj: Meena and Jamnalal's younger daughter; Simar and Gautam's sister; Siddhant's first wife (2011–2016) (Dead)
 Jhumki: Roli's lookalike; A street dancer (2013)
Manish Raisinghan as Siddhant Bharadwaj: Sujata and Rajendra's third son; Satyendra, Shailendra, Prem and Jhanvi's brother; Roli's widower; Prerna's husband (2011–2016)

Recurring
Jayati Bhatia as Nirmala Devi "Mataji" Bharadwaj: Manoranjan's sister; Rajendra and Suryendra's mother; Satyendra, Shailendra, Siddhant, Prem, Sankalp, Jhanvi and Cherry's grandmother; Anjali, Aarav, Nirvaan, Pratham and Piyush's great-grandmother; Sanjana's  great-grandmother (2011–2018)
Mansi Srivastava as Prerna Bharadwaj: Simar and Roli's friend; Siddhant's second wife (2016)
Varun Sharma as Piyush Bharadwaj: Simar and Prem's son; Anjali's brother; Sanjana's adoptive brother; Roshni's widower; Avni's husband (2016–2018)
Heer Morabia as Child Piyush (2016)
Vaishali Takkar as Anjali "Anju" Bharadwaj: Simar and Prem's daughter; Khushi's surrogate daughter; Piyush's sister; Sanjana's adoptive sister; Vikram and Sameer's ex-wife (2016–2017) 
 Sneha Chauhan as Teenage Anjali (2016)
 Ritvi Jain as Child Anjali (2014–2016)
 Nikki Sharma as Roshni Kapoor Bharadwaj: Rita and Sumit's daughter; Rohan's sister; Piyush's first wife (2016–2018)
Bhakti Vasani as Child Roshni (2016)
 Monica Sharma as Avni Bharadwaj: Hema's daughter; Piyush's second wife (2018)
 Krissann Barretto as Sanjana "Sanju" Bharadwaj Kapoor: Sunaina and Vikrant's daughter; Simar and Prem's adopted daughter; Anjali and Piyush's adopted sister; Sameer's wife (2017–2018)
 Tvisha Jain as Child Sanjana (2014–2016)
 Siddharth Shivpuri as Vikram Agarwal: Sanjeev's son; Anjali's ex-husband; Tanvi's husband (2016–2017)
 Rohan Mehra as Sameer Kapoor: Bhairavi and Dhanraj's son; Anjali's ex-husband; Sanjana's husband (2017–2018)
 Jyotsna Chandola as Khushi Bharadwaj: Anisha's sister; Sankalp's wife; Anjali's surrogate mother; Pratham's mother (2012–2017)
 Shweta Sinha as Pari Bhardwaj: Archala's daughter; Surbhi's sister; Shailendra's wife; Aarav's mother (2011–2018)
 Ashu Sharma as Satyendra "Sattu" Bhardwaj: Sujata and Rajendra's eldest son; Shailendra, Siddhant, Prem and Jhanvi's brother; Uma's husband (2011–2017)
 Snehal Sahay as Uma Bharadwaj: Satyendra's wife (2011–2017)
 Adarsh Gautam as Rajendra Bhardwaj: Nirmala's elder son; Suryendra's brother; Sujata's husband; Satyendra, Shailendra, Siddhant, Prem and Jhanvi's father; Anjali, Aarav, Nirvaan and Piyush's grandfather; Sanjana's adoptive grandfather (2011–2017)
 Nishigandha Wad as Sujata Bhardwaj: Rajendra's wife; Satyendra, Shailendra, Siddhant, Prem and Jhanvi's mother; Anjali, Aarav, Nirvaan and's grandmother; Sanjana's adoptive grandmother (2011–2016)
 Ashiesh Roy as Suryendra Bhardwaj: Nirmala's younger son; Rajendra's brother; Sankalp and Cherry's father; Pratham's grandfather (2011–2013)
 Jhanvi Vohra as Karuna Bhardwaj: Suryendra's wife; Sankalp and Cherry's mother; Pratham's grandmother (2011–2016)
 Sahil Anand / Ssumier Pasricha / Vishal Nayak as Shailendra "Shailu" Bhardwaj: Sujata and Rajendra's second son; Satyendra, Siddhant, Prem and Jhanvi's brother; Pari's husband; Aarav's father (2011) / (2011–2015) / (2015–2017)
 Falaq Naaz as Jhanvi Bharadwaj Malhotra: Sujata and Rajendra's daughter; Satyendra, Shailendra, Siddhant and Prem's sister; Shaurya and Anurag's ex-wife; Amar's wife; Nirvaan's mother (2013–2017)
 Alan Kapoor as Amar Malhotra: Siddhant and Prem's friend; Jhanvi's third husband (2015–2017) 
 Vandana Vithlani as Bhairavi Kapoor: Dhanraj's widow and murderer; Sameer's mother (2017–2018)
 Kanchi Singh as Cherry Bhardwaj: Suryendra and Karuna's daughter; Sankalp's sister (2011–2012)
 Abhishek Sharma / Aryamann Seth as Sankalp Bhardwaj: Suryendra and Karuna's son; Cherry's brother; Khushi's husband; Pratham's father (2011–2017)
 Priyamvada Kant as Anisha Kapadia: Khushi's sister (2012) (Dead)
 Nimisha Vakharia as Manoranjan Singh: Nirmala's sister; Rajveer's mother (2011–2015)
 Rohit Khurana as Shaurya Singhania: Meghna's brother; Jhanvi's ex-husband (2013) (Dead)
 Shikha Singh as Meghna Singhania: Shaurya's sister (2013–2014)
 Aniruddh Singh as Dr. Anurag Arora: Shanti's son; Jhanvi's ex-husband; Nirvaan's father (2014–2015)
 Karuna Verma as Shanti Arora: Anurag's mother (2013–2014)
 Shivangi Sharma as Bhakti Jaiswal: Anurag's friend (2014)
 Kanika Shivpuri as Pratima Arora: Anurag's aunt (2014)
 Pankaj Dheer as Jamnalal Dwivedi: Rajjo's brother; Meena's husband; Simar, Roli and Gautam's father; Anjali and Piyush's grandfather (2011–2012)
 Jaya Ojha as Meena Dwivedi: Jamnalal's wife; Simar, Roli and Gautam's mother; Anjali and Piyush's grandmother (2011–2013; 2014; 2016)
 Himani Shivpuri as Rajjo Dwivedi: Jamnalal's sister (2011–2012)
 Rakshit Wahi as Gautam Dwivedi: Meena and Jamnalal's son; Simar and Roli's brother (2011–2014)
 Abhinandan Jindal as Rohan Kapoor: Rita and Sumit's son; Roshni's brother (2016)
 Bhavesh Babani as Child Rohan (2016)
 Khushwant Walia as Aarav Bhardwaj: Pari and Shailendra's son; Ananya's husband (2017) 
 Kenisha Bharadwaj as Ananya Bhardwaj: Ridhima's sister; Aarav's wife (2017) 
 Ishani Sharma as Aliya Chaudhary: Roshni's murderer (2017–2018)
 Vishal Bhardwaj as Arjun Trivedi: Anjali's boyfriend (2017)
 Rushad Rana as Sumit Kapoor: Rita's husband; Rohan and Roshni's father (2016–2017)
Jasveer Kaur as Rita Kapoor: Sumit's wife; Rohan and Roshni's mother (2016–2017)
Vikas Sethi as Sanjeev Agarwal: Ravikant's brother; Vikram's father (2016–2017)
Sanjeev Jogityani as Ravikant Agarwal: Sanjeev's brother; Saroj's husband (2016–2017)
Shweta Gautam as Saroj Agarwal: Ravikant's wife (2016–2017)
Sneha Shah as Tanvi Agarwal: Vikram's wife (2017)
Preetika Chauhan as Ridhima Malhotra: Ananya's sister (2017)
Kajol Srivastav as Vaidehi Saxena: Piyush's ex-fiancée (2016–2017)
Unknown as Hema Sabharwal: Avni's mother (2018) 
Shabaaz Abdullah Badi as Rahul Arora: Avni's friend (2018)
Vishal Aditya Singh as Veer "Veeru" Sandhu: Khushi's partner (2012–2013)
Bobby Darling as Bobby (2013)
Swati Chitnis as Shobha (2013) 
Sana Amin Sheikh as Naina Kapoor: Siddhant's ex-fiancée (2012–2013)
Shalini Sahuta as Sonia Oberoi
Aruna Singhal/Roma Bali as Archala Sachdeva: Pari and Surbhi's mother (2014)
Nehalaxmi Iyer as Surbhi Bharadwaj: Pari's sister; Prem's former wife (2014) 
 Amita Khopkar as Jwala Devi (2014)
 Anshul Trivedi as Shrikant: Jwala's son (2014)
 Sara Khan as Maya: Shapeshifting serpent "Naagin"; Roli's impostor (2014–2015)
 Meera Deosthale as Priya Malik: Vikrant's employee (2014)
 Hirdeyjeet Jarnail Singh as Advocate Anup Roy (2014)
 Arun Bakshi as Balwant Gandhi
 Dolly Chawla as Sejal Gandhi
 Aadesh Chaudhary as Vikrant Mehta: Savita's elder son; Kartik's brother; Sunaina's husband; Sanjana's father; Simar's obsessed lover (2014) 
 Neetha Shetty as Sunaina "Aditi" Mehta: Vikrant's wife; Sanjana's mother (2014)
Minal Karpe as Savita Mehta: Vikrant and Kartik's mother; Sanjana's grandmother (2014)
Pratik Shukla as Kartik Mehta: Savita's younger son; Vikrant's brother; Kavya's husband (2014)
Sadhana Sharma as Kavya Mehta: Karthik's wife (2014)
 Priyanka Bhole as Leela
 Khyati Keswani as Guru Maa (2015)
 Siddharth Vasudev as Rajveer Singh: Manoranjan's son (2015)
 Sayantani Ghosh as Rajkumari Rajeshwari Parmar (2015)
 Kunika as Thakurain
 Pratyusha Banerjee as Mohini: Witch; Sunanda's daughter; Indravati's disciple (2015)
 Anjali Mehta as Sunanda: Witch; Mohini's mother (2015) (Dead)
 Reshmi Ghosh as Indravati Singh: Witch; Simar's sister from her previous birth Padmavati; Gajendra's lover (2015)
 Hemant Choudhary as Indravati and Padmavati’s Father: Renowned Musician, was later killed by Indravati (2015)
 Meghna Naidu as Patali Devi Gayatri (2015–2016) 
 Deblina Chatterjee as Devika Bharadwaj: Simar's helper; Prem's third wife (2015–2016)
Ali Hassan as Shaitan (2016) 
 Arti Singh as Madhavi (2016)
 Shagufta Ali as Suganda (2016)
 Kashvi Kothari as Choti Dulhan/Ruhi (2016)
 Vindhya Tiwari as Chandramani (2016)
 Vaishnavi Dhanraj as Kamya Raichand (2016)
 Kamalika Guha Thakurta as Mahamaya (2016)

Special appearances 
 Shah Rukh Khan
 Mahhi Vij as Nakusha
 Drashti Dhami as Madhubala Kundra from Madhubala – Ek Ishq Ek Junoon 
 Tina Dutta as Ichha Singh Bundela from Uttaran
 Rashami Desai as Tapasya Pratap Rathore from Uttaran 
 Toral Rasputra as Anandi Shekhar from Balika Vadhu
 Sidharth Shukla as Shivraj Shekhar from balika vadhu
 Helly Shah as Swara Maheshwari from swaragini
 Varun Kapoor as Sanskaar Maheshwari from swaragini 
 Namish Taneja as Lakshya Maheshwari from swaragini 
 Tejasswi Prakash as Ragini Maheshwari swaragini 
 Mouni Roy as Shivanya Singh from Naagin 1
 Rubina Dilaik as Soumya Singh from Shakti - Astitva Ke Ehsaas Ki
 Ankitta Sharma as Naina Singh Chauhan from Ek Shringaar-Swabhiman

Sequel

A reboot of the show, named Sasural Simar Ka 2,  is being telecast on the same channel since 26 April 2021, ten years after the first season started airing.

Production

Casting
It first starred Dipika Kakar, Shoaib Ibrahim, Avika Gor and Manish Raisinghan as Simar, Prem, Roli and Siddhant respectively Jayati Bhatia played role of Mataji on the Show. Shoaib Ibrahim left the show in 2013 as makers weren't giving his character much screen space disappointment with the creative independence of the character. He was replaced by Dheeraj Dhoopar who played the role of Prem after shoaib's exit from the show. In April 2016, Avika Gor left the show as she wanted a break after working non-stop for 10 years. Thus, her character Roli was shown to have died in the show. Mansi Srivastava entered the series as Prerna, Simar's childhood friend. In July 2016, Mansi Srivastava and Manish Raisinghan also left the show. So, their respective characters of Prerna and Siddhant were shown to have shifted abroad. In August 2016, Vaishali Takkar and Varun Sharma entered the show as Anjali and Piyush, respectively. In February 2017, Dipika Kakar quit the show and was replaced by Keerti Gaekwad Kelkar . In June 2017, Krissann Barretto entered the show as Sanjana. After sometime Dheeraj Dhoopar quit the show. At the end of August 2017, Mazher Sayed entered the show in the role of Prem. In December 2017, Vaishali Takkar left the show. So her character of Anjali was shown to have arrested in the show. In January 2018, Nikki Sharma also left the show. So her character of Roshni was shown to have died in the show. In the same month, Monica Sharma entered the show in the role of Avni.

Genre
The series began and ran as a normal television drama until in 2015 when it included supernatural and fantasy genres with tracks inspired from Game of Thrones and Eega.

Cancellation and sequel

The series was confirmed going off air on 2 March 2018 owing its declining ratings and the climax was decided but days before the shooting was about to complete, it received an extension on last minute discussions between the channel and production house and the script was reworked. In February 2021, the series was confirmed returning with a new season titled, Sasural Simar Ka 2, featuring Dipika Kakar and Jayati Bhatia from the former season and Radhika Muthukumar, Tanya Sharma, Avinash Mukherjee and Karan Sharma as the new leads of the show.

Location
Based on Delhi as backdrop, Sasural Simar Ka was mainly filmed at the sets in Cine Classic Studios at Mira Road. Some episodes are shot in Hong Kong for their 1000th episodes celebration.

Crossover episodes

Reception
The series became one of the most watched Hindi GECs during its run time. In week 52 of 2015 it was at fifth position garnering 12.33 million impressions. In week 2 of 2016, it was at third position with 13.46 million impressions.

Awards and nominations

References

External links

Indian television soap operas
2011 Indian television series debuts
2018 Indian television series endings
Colors TV original programming
Indian supernatural television series
Indian fantasy television series
Television shows set in Delhi